The Roslyn East Gate Toll House is located within the Roslyn Cemetery on Route 25A (Northern Boulevard) in Greenvale in the Town of North Hempstead, Nassau County, New York It was built in 1864 and is the last remaining toll house for the North Hempstead Turnpike. It is frequently but incorrectly assumed to be a toll house for the "Vanderbilt Motor Parkway" which ran considerably south of this location.

Over the years as development continued, the North Hempstead Turnpike was moved about 150 feet south of its original path (now called Northern Blvd.) and the Roslyn Cemetery (owned by the Roslyn Presbyterian Church) slowly surrounded the "East Gate Toll House". There was a "West Gate Toll House" on the western side of the Roslyn viaduct on Northern Blvd. but either due to massive renovation or removal it is no longer recognizable.

With the demise of the toll road the Roslyn East Gate Toll House became no more than a storage shed for cemetery tools.

In the early 1980s, Dr. Roger Gerry (President of the Roslyn Landmark Society) desired to have the Roslyn East Gate Toll House restored. Due to budget constraints of the Roslyn Presbyterian Church, this was not possible.

A solution was found by a three way agreement between the Roslyn Landmark Society, the Roslyn Presbyterian Church and Richard Hahn whereby Richard Hahn would restore the building at his time and expense to the specifications of the Roslyn Landmark Society. In return, Richard Hahn would utilize the building for his own residence. A historical architect prepared detailed drawings, microscopic paint analysis was done on all painted surfaces to determine original paint colors and after two years of work by Richard Hahn the project was completed to specifications.

The Roslyn East Gate Toll House has been included in the annual "Roslyn Walking Tour" and a very detailed description of its history written by Dr. Roger Gerry which can be found in one of the "Roslyn Landmark" tour guides.

The Roslyn East Gate Toll House continues to be a private residence.

It was added to the NRHP on August 16, 1977.

References

Government buildings on the National Register of Historic Places in New York (state)
Houses in Nassau County, New York
Toll houses on the National Register of Historic Places
National Register of Historic Places in Nassau County, New York
1860 establishments in New York (state)
Houses completed in 1860